Adolf Armah is a Ghanaian former professional footballer who played as a defender. He is known for his involvement in the squad that won the 1978 African Cup of Nations.

Club career 
Armah played for Accra Hearts of Oak from the 1975 to 1983 season. In 1979, he was named as the second best African Footballer of the Year with Cameroonian player Thomas N´kono beating him the ultimate. During his playing days he was given the nickname as Rolandanster or Midfield Marshall, due to his midfield prowess and his ability to control the midfield during a match. He later played for other clubs in Egypt, Cote d’voire, Gabon and the United Arab Emirates (UAE).

International career 
Armah played in both the and 1978, 1980 African Cup of Nations helping Ghana lift the cup in 1978 after beating Uganda 2–0 to make Ghana the first ever country to win the African Cup of Nations three times. The Ghana team gained popularity after they were dubbed ‘the Brazil of Africa’ due to winning the AFCON similar to Brazil in 1970 as they won the World Cup for their third time. Coincidentally, the Ghanaian squad had their training tour in Brazil before the AFCON tournament.

Armah captained the Black Stars between 1981 and 1982, and he led the team to qualify to 1982 African Cup of Nations, but was not part of the team that won the cup.

Coaching career 
After retiring, he returned to Accra Hearts of Oak to serve as a member of their technical team and an assistant coach in the early 2000s including under Ernst Middendorp and Cecil Jones Attuquayefio. He served as an assistant coach alongside Emmanuel Ofei Ansah in 2004. 
He was the head coach of African Stars 2003

Honours

Club 
Hearts of Oak

 Ghana Premier League: 1976, 1978, 1979
 Ghanaian FA Cup: 1979, 1981

International 
Ghana

 African Cup of Nations: 1978

Individual 

 African Player of the Year second place: 1979

References

External links 

Living people
Year of birth missing (living people)
Association football defenders
Ghanaian footballers
Accra Hearts of Oak S.C. players
Ghana Premier League players
Ghana international footballers
1978 African Cup of Nations players
1980 African Cup of Nations players
Africa Cup of Nations-winning players
Accra Hearts of Oak S.C. non-playing staff